A national god is a guardian divinity whose special concern is the safety and well-being of an ethnic group (nation), and of that group's leaders. This is contrasted with other guardian figures such as family gods responsible for the well-being of individual clans or professions, or personal gods who are responsible for the well-being of individuals.

Ancient gods
In antiquity (and to some extent continuing today), religion was a characteristic of regional culture, together with language, customs, traditions, etc. Many of these ethnic religions included national god(s) in their pantheons, such as  
 Amaterasu of the Japanese;
 Amun, Amun-Ra and Horus for the Egyptians; 
 Apollo for the people of Troy;
 Aramazd for Armenians
 eponymous Assur for the Assyrians;
 Ashtoret for the Sidonians; 
 the eponymous Athena-Mykene for the Athenians and Mycenaeans; 
 Baal for the Phoenicians;
 Bathala of the Tagalogs;
 Chemosh for the Moabites;
 Dagon for Philistia;
 Gaut for the Geats;
 Huitzilopochtli of the Tenochtitlan Aztecs;
 Indra for the Vedic Indians;
 Inti for the Incas;
 Itzamna for the Mayas;
 Jade Emperor for the Chinese;
 Kataragama deviyo for Sri Lanka;
Ông Trời for the Vietnamese;
 Lugh (Gaulish Mercury, Lugus, Lleu) for the ancient Celts;
 Marduk for the Babylonians; 
 Mars and eponymous Romulus-Quirinus for the Romans; 
 Milcom for the Ammonites;
 Perun for the ancient Slavs;
 Rangi and Papa for the Māori people;
 Qos for the Edomites;
 Siam Devadhiraj for the Thais;
 Murugan for the Tamils;
 the Sovereignty goddess and eponymous Ériu for Ireland;
 Tengri for the Turks and Mongols; 
 Teshub for the Hittites;
 Ukko for the Finns;
 Wadd for the Kingdom of Awsan;
 Yahweh for the Israelites;
 Zalmoxis for the Dacians.

In antiquity
In antiquity, each ethnic group (nation) had its own pantheon, which may or may not have overlapped with that of neighbouring groups. Many of these religions had guardian figures, which then sometimes included national gods, who were considered responsible for the safety and well-being of the nation and of its people, with a special concern for the nation's ruler and guardian. These national gods stood alongside the personal gods (that is, the patron gods who took a special interest in an individual's personal well-being). Additionally, there were the family gods associated with the care of a clan or profession, as well as gods associated with specific situations or the protection thereof (fertility, health, war, contracts and so on).

This perception of divinity was common in the ancient world. Deities were often geographically localized by association to their main cult centers, and in the Ancient Near East were often tutelary deities of their respective city-states. Many of the individual ethnic groups also considered itself the progeny of its national gods. For example, in the region that is now Yemen, the Sabaeans, the Minaeans and the Himyar each perceived themselves to be the children of respectively Almaqah, Wadd and Shamash. Similarly, in Canaan, Milcom held that role for the Ammonites, while Chemosh did so for the Moab.

Yahweh's role as god of the Kingdom of Judah and the Kingdom of Israel is a key reason for that figure's adoption as the monist figure by the Yahweh-only movement of the 7th-century BC. Yahweh's subsequent exaltation as a supreme figure occurred not because national gods were necessarily heads of their pantheons (this was certainly not the case for the national gods of the peoples surrounding Israel), but as a reaction to the changing political landscape, in which other national gods had previously become exalted in that fashion. Because peoples were perceived to effectively worship the same gods, merely by different names (Smith (2008) terms this "translatability"), Yahweh's function as a national god had previously automatically equated him with other national gods. Thus, with the rise of the multi-cultural Assyrian Empire in the 10th century BC, the concomitant rise of the Assyrian's nation god Assur to inter-cultural prominence influenced how national gods were generally perceived. Moreover, the political unification of the fractured nation-states under a single supreme head of state encouraged the idea of a multi-national "one-god" worldview as well. By the 7th-century BC however, Assyria was in decline and the smaller nation-states began to reassert their independence. In this context, the development of a "one-god" worldview in 7th century BC Kingdom of Judah can be perceived as a response to the diminishing claims to cultural hegemony of the Assyrian "one-god" ideology of the time. The process is evident in some parts of the Torah which predate the 6th century BC and thus preserve vestiges of the theology centered on a national god during the 10th-century BC monarchic period. "The OT  is still conscious of the fact that Yhwh, the national god of Israel, originally was one of the gods in the council of El." (Deut 32:8-9*)

Modern period

Philippine
In search of a national culture and identity away from the Catholic religion imposed by Spain during its colonisation of the Philippines, those who instigated the Philippine Revolution proposed to revive indigenous Philippine folk religions and make them the national religion of the entire country. The Katipunan opposed the religious teachings of the Spanish friars, saying that they "obscured rather than explained religious truths." After the revival of the Katipunan during the Spanish–American War, an idealized form of the folk religions was proposed by some, with the worship of God under the ancient name Bathala, which applies to all supreme deities under the many ethnic pantheons across the country. However, the re-vitalization process of the indigenous faiths of the Philippines did not progress further as the Filipino forces were defeated by the Americans in 1902, which led to the second Christian colonization of the archipelago.

Christianity
Christian missionaries have repeatedly re-interpreted national gods in terms of the Christian God. This fact is reflected in the names of God in various languages of Christianized peoples, such as Shangdi or Shen among Chinese Christians, Ngai among a number of tribes of Kenya, etc.

In a modern context, the term of a "national god" addresses the emergence of national churches within Christianity.  This tendency of "nationalizing" the Christian God, especially in the context of national churches sanctioning warfare against other Christian nations during World War I, was denounced as heretical by Karl Barth.

Germanic
Carl Jung in his essay Wotan (1936) identifies the Germanic god of the storm (leader of the Wild Hunt), Wotan, as the national god of the German people, and warns of the rise of German nationalism and ultimately the then-impending catastrophe of Nazism and World War II in terms of the re-awakening of this god:
"But what is more than curious — indeed, piquant to a degree — is that an ancient god of storm and frenzy, the long quiescent Wotan, should awake, like an extinct volcano, to new activity, in a civilized country that had long been supposed to have outgrown the Middle Ages. [...] I venture the heretical suggestion that the unfathomable depths of Wotan's character explain more of National Socialism than all three reasonable factors [viz. economic, political, and psychological] put together. [...] This is a tragic experience and no disgrace. It has always been terrible to fall into the hands of a living god. Yahweh was no exception to this rule, and the Philistines, Edomites, Amorites and the rest, who were outside the Yahweh experience, must certainly have found it exceedingly disagreeable. The Semitic experience of Allah was for a long time an extremely painful affair for the whole of Christendom. We who stand outside judge the Germans far too much, as if they were responsible agents, but perhaps it would be nearer the truth to regard them, also, as victims."

Hindu

One of the primary ancient Vedic deities in Hinduism is Indra. He is the king of Svarga (Heaven) and the Devas (gods). He is associated with lightning, thunder, storms, rains, river flows and war. Indra's mythology and powers are similar to other Indo-European deities such as Jupiter, Perun, Perkūnas, Zalmoxis, Taranis, Zeus, and Thor, suggesting a common origin in Proto-Indo-European mythology. Starting in the late late 19th century, Bharat Mata, a divine personification of India (Bharat), came into existence after the Indian Rebellion of 1857 against the British and is seen as the goddess of India and the Indian people by Hindus, Jains, and some Buddhist.

See also
 Constitutional references to God
 Ethnic religion
 God and the State
 Imperial cult
 National personification
 Religious exclusivism

References

 
Ethnic religion
Polytheism